M. brevicollis may refer to:

Meloe brevicollis, a beetle species
Miaenia brevicollis, a beetle species